Now That's What I Call Country is a country music compilation album released on August 26, 2008. The album is the first in the (U.S.) Now! series to be composed exclusively of country music tracks. All of the tracks peaked inside the top 20 of the Billboard Hot Country Songs chart, 16 of which were top 5 hits with 5 of those reaching number one.

The album debuted at number 1 on the Billboard Top Country Albums chart and peaked at number 7 on the Billboard 200 in September 2008.

Track listing

Free downloads
The Now That's What I Call Country CD can also unlock free downloads for the following tracks:
Eric Church – "Carolina"
Jamey Johnson – "High Cost of Living"
The Lost Trailers –  "Hey Baby"
Ashton Shepherd – "Ain't Dead Yet"
Emily West – "Annie's Gonna Get a Brand New Gun"
Chuck Wicks – "Man of the House"

Chart performance

Weekly charts

Year-end charts

Certifications

References

2008 compilation albums
Country music compilation albums
Country 01